Ziziphus nummularia, commonly known as wild jujube or jhahrberi in Hindi, is a species of Ziziphus native to the Thar Desert of western India and southeastern Pakistan, south Iran, Afghanistan, Lebanon and Zimbabwe. The leaves are rounded like those of Ziziphus jujuba but differ from those in having a pubescence on the adaxial surface. The plant is commonly found in arid areas, hills, plains, and agricultural fields.

Description
The branches and twigs have a velvety texture and a pale purplish colour. The lateral roots are long and spread deeply into the substrate. The inflorescence is a cyme, the individual pale yellow flowers being bisexual with parts in fives, and often having no petals. They are followed by small red or blackish drupes not exceeding  in diameter, containing a hard stone, inside which there are usually two seeds.

Distribution and habitat
Ziziphus nummularia is native to India, Pakistan, Afghanistan, Iran, Lebanon and Zimbabwe. It is tolerant of a range of habitats including hillsides, plains, ravines, cultivated areas and sand dunes. On the sandy hills of southern Rajasthan, it is associated with Euphorbia caducifolia, Butea monosperma,  Millettia pinnata, Syzygium hyrianium and Wrightia tinctoria.

Uses

Ziziphus nummularia has been used for erosion control, reducing wind damage, and allowing deposited material to stabilise, forming a microhabitat that enables other plants such as grasses to grow. The shrub sends up many suckers from the root system and can be planted to form a windbreak, sometimes in association with Crotalaria burhia. The timber is used in building construction and to make farm implements, and it also makes good fuel and charcoal. The leaves can provide forage for livestock; in India they are picked, dried, and stored, producing about  dried foliage per hectare. The fruits are edible, sweet, and acidic. They can be eaten raw, pickled, dried, or used to make confectionery. Rats and gerbils are also attracted to the fruit, which can therefore be used in poison baits to attract the rodents.

References

Medias

nummularia
Flora of India (region)
Flora of Iran
Flora of Pakistan
Flora of Qatar
Plants used in Ayurveda
Taxa named by Nicolaas Laurens Burman